A debugging pattern describes a generic set of steps to rectify or correct a bug within a software system.  It is a solution to a recurring problem that is related to a particular bug or type of bug in a specific context.

A bug pattern is a particular type of pattern.  The original concept of a pattern was introduced by the architect Christopher Alexander as a design pattern.

Some examples of debugging patterns include:
 Eliminate noise bug pattern – Isolate and expose a particular bug by eliminating all other noise in the system.  This enables you to concentrate on finding the real issue.
 Recurring bug pattern – Expose a bug via a unit test.  Run that unit test as part of a standard build from that moment on.  This ensure that the bug will not recur.
 Time-specific bug pattern – Expose the bug by writing a continuous test that runs continuously and fails when an expected error occurs.  This is useful for transient bugs.

See also 
 Design pattern
 Architectural pattern (computer science)

External links 
 A Pattern Language for Software Debugging (PDF)

Software architecture
Software design patterns